"Me, Myself & I" is a 2018 song by English duo Blonde featuring English singer Bryn Christopher, released on 6 July 2018.

Critical reception
Mike Wass of Idolator called the song a "banger" and a "thumping house collaboration with Bryn Christopher", and said that along with their previous single "Just for One Night", it is Blonde's catchiest song. Wass finished his review by recommending it thus: "If you're feeling wronged, feisty or just celebrating your independence, this is the tune for you!" Writing for Paper, Michael Love Michael judged the track to be "hi-fi pop gloss that does indeed promote self-love and empowerment, complete with a belted high-fructose chorus". Lewis Corner of Gay Times agreed that the track is a "banger", also naming it a "stomping new anthem" and "a euphoric house banger ready to dominate the summer".

Music video
The music video, directed by Jordan Rossi, was released the same day as the song. Paper called it a celebration of individuality on the dancefloor, and a "queer self-love anthem".

Track listing

References

2018 singles
2018 songs
Blonde (duo) songs
Bryn Christopher songs
FFRR Records singles
Songs written by Bryn Christopher
Songs written by Jacob Manson